The Miriwoong people, also written Miriwung and Miriuwung,  are an Aboriginal Australian people of the Kimberley region of northern Western Australia.

Language

Miriwoong language (AIATSIS "Miriwoong / Miriuwung") is one of the three surviving tongues of the Jarrakan languages, the word jarrak meaning language, talk, speech. Miriwung is on the verge of extinction with only 20 fluent speakers remaining. A word in the language is jendoobang, which means 'string' and has a comitative suffix.

Country
Its eastern flank lay just across the border with the Northern Territory, at Newry Station. They dwelt also along the Keep River down to the coast.

Running clockwise from the north, the neighbours of the Miriwung (excluding the poorly attested Doolboong, were the Gajirrawoong, then on the northeastern flank the Jamindjung, followed by the Ngarinman due east, the Gija at their southern confines and the Ngarinyin to their west.

The Miriwoong people were represented in a successful native title claim by the Kimberley Land Council in two joint claims with the Gajirrawoong people, as "Miriuwung Gajerrong". The Federal Court recognised the native title rights of the two peoples on 9 December 2003, nearly ten years after the claim had been lodged. Exclusive possession was recognised across several community-leased areas.

Alternative names
 Miriwun, Miriwong, Mirriwong
 Miriwu (a Gija exonym)
 Moreng ("westerners"), Mirong, Mirung

Modern times
Most traditional Miriwung live in Kununurra and outlying stations.

References

Sources

Aboriginal peoples of Western Australia
Kimberley (Western Australia)